Ciprian Nicolae Daroczi (born 15 May 1998) is a Romanian bobsledder. He competed in the two-man event at the 2018 and 2022 Winter Olympics.

References

External links
 

1998 births
Living people
Romanian male bobsledders
Olympic bobsledders of Romania
Bobsledders at the 2018 Winter Olympics
Bobsledders at the 2022 Winter Olympics
Place of birth missing (living people)
21st-century Romanian people